Koratla may refer to:

 Korutla, also known as Koratla, a town in Telangana, India
 Koratla (Assembly constituency), a constituency of the Telangana Legislative Assembly, India
 Koratla railway station, an Indian Railways station